The 1907 All England Open Badminton Championships was a badminton tournament held at the London Rifle Brigade Drill Hall, Islington, London, England, from February 27 to March 2, 1907.

Norman Wood retained his singles title.

Final results

Men's singles

Women's singles

Men's doubles

Women's doubles

Mixed doubles

References

All England Open Badminton Championships
All England Badminton Championships
All England Open Badminton Championships in London
All England Championships
All England Badminton Championships
All England Badminton Championships